Nizhnechumanka is a rural locality (a selo) and the administrative center of Nizhnechumansky Selsoviet, Bayevsky District, Altai Krai, Russia. The population was 861 as of 2013. There are 13 streets.

Geography 
Nizhnechumanka is located near the Kulunda river, 15 km southwest of Bayevo (the district's administrative centre) by road. Rybnye Borki is the nearest rural locality.

References 

Rural localities in Bayevsky District